Fr. Alceoni Berkenbrock (born September 30, 1963, Florianópolis) is a Brazilian writer and catholic priest.

Biography 
The youngest son of José Berkenbrock and Luci Berkenbrock, brother of Arno and Zioni. He carried out the initial studies in São José (SC). Ordained Deacon on April 24, 1993, and Presbyter on July 10 of the same year, in the Mother Church of the Santa Cruz Parish.

Functions 
The first occupation was in 1993 as vicar of the parish of Santo Antônio, in the district of Campinas (São José – SC). He then became parish priest of the Parish of Nossa Senhora Aparecida, in the Procasa district. In 1999, he took over the São João Batista Parish in Itajaí. In 2007, he moved to Garopaba to be the Parish Priest of the São Joaquim Parish.

He returned to São José in 2012, where he has since served as Parish Priest of the Sagrados Corações de Jesus Parish in Barreiros. And Vicar General of Forania São José (Barreiros) since 2015.

Pana project 
The project is a partnership between Caritas Internationalis from Switzerland and Brazil in the framework of refugee immigration and humanitarian assistance. In the language of the Warao people, indigenous ethnicity of Venezuelan territory, pana means friend, partner.

Brazil has received a much smaller number of refugees than other South American nations, especially those that do not have a border with Venezuela, such as Peru, which received 354,000 people until July 2018. Chile had 105,700 refugees, and Argentina had 95,000 refugees.

Books 
 365 Dias Rezando pelas Vocações (2016)

Awards 
 Freedom of the City of Garopaba (SC).

See also 

 Fr. Alcione Berkenbrock Institute:

References 

Brazilian people of Portuguese descent
Brazilian people of German descent
1963 births
20th-century Brazilian Roman Catholic priests
Living people
21st-century Brazilian Roman Catholic priests